SM U-27 was a German Type U-27 U-boat built for service in the Imperial German Navy. She was launched on 14 July 1913, and commissioned on 8 May 1914 with Kapitänleutnant Bernd Wegener in command.

On 18 October 1914, the British submarine  was torpedoed and sunk in the North Sea by U-27. This was the first action in which one submarine sank another.

Sinking of HMS E3
 had sailed from Harwich on 16 October to patrol off Borkum in the North Sea. On 18 October, E3 spotted some German destroyers ahead but was unable to get into a position to take a shot at them. Unable to pass them, Commander Cholmley retreated into the bay to wait for them to disperse. As he did so, he failed to see that the bay was also occupied by U-27, under Kapitänleutnant Bernd Wegener.

Wegener was surfaced and patrolling between the Ems and Borkum when at 11:25, an object resembling a buoy was spotted where no buoy should be. Suspecting a British submarine, U-27 immediately dived and closed the object. Although the enemy was ‘conned down’, the number 83 was clearly visible on the conning tower of the British boat, now identified as such beyond reasonable doubt. Wegener tracked the submarine for two hours until able to approach ‘up sun’. He noted that the look-outs were staring intently in the other direction, towards the Ems. An explosion 12 seconds later sank E3 immediately. The KTB records that men (probably the look-outs from the bridge) were visible in the water but U-27 dived and withdrew, fearful that a second British submarine might be lurking nearby. 30 minutes later, the U-boat returned to the scene to search for evidence and possible survivors but without success. All 28 members of E3s crew were lost.

Other encounters
 31 October 1914, U-27 sank the seaplane carrier  in the Straits of Dover, in position .
 11 March 1915, U-27 sank the armed merchant cruiser HMS Bayano off Carswell Point, Stranraer at position .
 18 May 1915 –  was torpedoed and sunk by U-27 eleven miles NE of Trevose Head in Cornwall. She was in ballast from Barry to Port Arthur, Texas. 
 19 May 1915 –  was torpedoed and sunk by U-27 13 miles north of Trevose Head. She was carrying coal from Cardiff to Livorno with the loss of two lives

Sinking

On 19 August 1915, U-27 was sunk in the Western Approaches in position  by gunfire from Q-ship . The same day, U-boat U-24 had sunk the White Star Liner SS Arabic, infuriating the crew of Baralong which were in the region but could do nothing. Upon encountering U-27, the crew of Baralong hauled down the neutral American flag they had been flying as a false flag and hauled up the White Ensign. A one-sided engagement ensued in which U-27 was hit several times and began to sink. 

According to Tony Bridgland;

Herbert screamed, "Cease fire!" But his men's blood was up. They were avenging the Arabic and the Lusitania. For them this was no time to cease firing, even as the survivors of the crew appeared on the outer casing, struggling out of their clothes to swim away from her. There was a mighty hiss of compressed air from her tanks and the U-27 vanished from sight in a vortex of giant rumbling bubbles, leaving a pall of smoke over the spot where she had been. It had taken only a few minutes to fire the thirty-four shells into her.

12 German survivors swam from the wreck U-27 to Baralong seeking safety;, but commanding officer Godfrey Herbert, acting under verbal orders relayed by two officers of the Admiralty's Secret Service branch to, "Take no prisoners from U-boats", ordered his men, in violation of the Hague Conventions, to shoot the unarmed German survivors in the water with small arms, killing all 12. Herbert then dispatched 12 Royal Marines from Baralong with orders to take no prisoners from the remaining German survivors aboard Nicosian. Despite the British Government's attempted cover up, the incident caused a formal protest by the U.S. State Department and sparked outrage in Germany, and a debate took place in the Reichstag on 15 January 1916, where it was described as a "cowardly murder"; the German government soon announced that they would conduct reprisals, although they did not specify what they would be.

HMS Baralongs actions, which remain the most infamous British war crime of the First World War, also caused the Imperial German Navy to cease conforming to the Prize Rules and to practise unrestricted submarine warfare. During the Second World War, it was cited as a reason for the Kriegsmarine to do the same. A German medal was issued commemorating the victims of the event.

Meanwhile, the Military Bureau for the Investigation of Violations of the Laws of War added Baralongs commanding officer, whose name was known only as "Captain William McBride", to the Prussian Ministry of War's "Black List of Englishmen who are Guilty of Violations of the Laws of War vis-à-vis Members of the German Armed Forces".

Summary of raiding history

References

Notes

Citations

Bibliography

Type U 27 submarines
U-boats commissioned in 1914
Maritime incidents in 1915
U-boats sunk in 1915
World War I submarines of Germany
World War I shipwrecks in the Atlantic Ocean
1913 ships
Ships built in Danzig
U-boats sunk by British warships
Ships lost with all hands
World War I massacres
World War I crimes by the British Empire and Commonwealth